is a Japanese women's professional shogi player ranked 1-dan.

Promotion history
Wakita's promotion history is as follows:

 2-kyū: November 1, 2018
 2-kyū: February 6, 2019
 1-dan: April 1, 2020

Note: All ranks are women's professional ranks.

References

External links
 ShogiHub: Wakita, Nanako

1997 births
Living people
People from Ichinomiya, Aichi
Japanese shogi players
Women's professional shogi players
Professional shogi players from Aichi Prefecture
Meijo University alumni